John T. Banks, Sr. (ca. 1922 – December 6, 2011) was a baseball player who pitched and played first base in the Negro leagues in the 1940s and 1950s.

He began playing semi-professional baseball while still attending Camden High School. He then played for the Philadelphia Stars of the Negro National League before serving three years in the US Army in World War II. He rejoined the team in 1947. He joined the Negro American League in 1950 and played through 1959 on regional teams and for barnstorming off-season squads. He is also listed as playing with the Baltimore Elite Giants in 1950.

Banks died on December 14, 2011.

References

External links
 

Baltimore Elite Giants players
Philadelphia Stars players
African-American baseball players
1920s births
Year of birth uncertain
2011 deaths
African Americans in World War II
United States Army personnel of World War II
21st-century African-American people
African-American United States Army personnel